The Yamaha XJR1200 is a motorcycle manufactured by the Yamaha Motor Company. It was designed in the early 1990s to compete with the high powered naked bikes already on the market such as the Kawasaki Zephyr 1100 and Honda CB1000.

See also
List of Yamaha motorcycles

References

XJR1300
Motorcycles introduced in 1995